Paweł Hadrych (born 14 June 1972) is a Polish sports shooter. He competed in the men's 10 metre air pistol event at the 1992 Summer Olympics.

References

1972 births
Living people
Polish male sport shooters
Olympic shooters of Poland
Shooters at the 1992 Summer Olympics
People from Zielona Góra